The McCullough Cup is a hockey competition. It is an annual tournament played for by schools affiliated to the Ulster Branch of the Irish Hockey Association. The competition is held in the winter term of each school year, with the older Burney Cup running in the Spring term.

The most successful school is Royal Belfast Academical Institution with 17 wins (16 outright wins and 1 shared win). The current holder is Royal Belfast Academical Institution.

Trophy

The trophy is called The Ian McCullough Memorial Cup. It was donated by a well-known family in Northern Ireland hockey circles, in memory of their son Ian.

Ian (full name – John Truesdale McCullough) was a 15-year-old Newry Grammar School pupil. He was accidentally killed after being struck by a hockey ball during a match against Royal Belfast Academical Institution at Bladon Drive on 3 December 1960.

Teams

The teams that compete for this trophy are the strongest boys' first teams from schools in Ulster. All players must be under 18 on 1 July at the start of the year of the competition. Fourteen teams from thirteen schools competed for the trophy in the 2013–14 season.

Format

The competition started out as a straight knockout event with the first winners being the defunct Bushmills Grammar School. However it was soon decided to move all matches to the winter term, with a league format introduced to provide all schools with a guaranteed number of fixtures.

Under the current format, all teams are divided into two pools, with each school playing all the other schools in their pool once. The top two teams from each pool qualify for the semi-finals.

In the semi-finals the teams in first place in the pools play the second place teams from the other pool.

The winners of the semi-final ties contest the final, which is usually played at a neutral venue on the second Wednesday in December.

Performance by school

Footnote

 † Total includes Annadale Grammar School performance (one win and one beaten finalist). Wellington College was formed as a result of merger involving Annadale Grammar School.

Finals

1960s

1970s

1980s

1990s

2000s

2010s

2020s

Sources

External links
 Ulster Branch of Irish Hockey Union

Field hockey competitions in Ulster
1961 establishments in Ireland
Field hockey cup competitions in Ireland